This is a list of defunct airlines of Burkina Faso.

See also

 List of airlines of Burkina Faso
 List of airports in Burkina Faso

References 

 
Burkina Faso
Airlines, defunct